Emily-Anne "Elf" Lyons (born 10 June 1991) is a British stand-up comedian, writer and actress. Lyons is the daughter of economist Gerard Lyons.

Early life
Lyons is the daughter of economist Gerard Lyons. Her mother, Annette, is a painter and she has two siblings. She earned a BA in Drama from Bristol University and an MA in Theatre & Performance from Queen Mary University of London. She then studied at École Philippe Gaulier in Étampes, near Paris.

Career
Lyons was the runner up for a Funny Women award in 2013. Her solo show Being Barbarella was an IdeasTap award winner at the Vault Festival at The Vaults, Waterloo, before Lyons travelled to Australia to perform it at the Adelaide Fringe Festival in 2015. She was a founder of "The Secret Comedians", a collective who run comedy nights in East London and was a regular compere at the Camden Comedy Club in Camden, London. She was a co-director of OddFlock, a London-based theatre company made up of a group of Drama graduates from the University of Bristol. She also directed at Riverside Studios, The Lion & Unicorn Theatre, Etcetera Theatre, and was a General Manager of the Finborough Theatre.

Vogue called Lyons one of the five best new British female Comics. In 2017 her show Swan was nominated for Best Show at the Edinburgh Comedy Awards. Stephen Armstrong, in The Times wrote: "It was ludicrous and hilarious." Bruce Dessau, reviewing her 2018 musical show ChiffChaff in The Evening Standard, gave the show four out of five stars. He called Lyons "a compelling physical presence" and judged that "as a loopy, unique mash-up ChiffChaff is bang on the money". Later in 2018 she performed a new show, Medusa. An early 2019 show was called "Love Songs to Guinea Pigs".

She has written for The Guardian.

References

External links

YouTube channel

1991 births
Place of birth missing (living people)
Living people
English stand-up comedians
English women comedians